Lentney Battery is a former 20th-century gun battery, built in 1905 as one of three 6-inch gun batteries to defend the Eastern approaches to Plymouth Sound, for the defence of the Royal Naval Dockyard at Devonport. It shared accommodation with the nearby Renney Battery.

It was armed with two 6-inch Mark VII breechloading naval guns In 1914 a blockhouse and unclimbable fence was added. The battery was manned by the Devonshire royal Garrison Artillery. In 1930 the battery was disarmed, but later re-armed during the Second World War.

After the Second World War the battery was used as one of the practice batteries for the Coast Artillery Training School. On the dissolution of coast artillery in the United Kingdom in 1956 the battery was disarmed. It was released by the military in 1991, and became Grade II listed the following year.

References

Bibliography

External sources
 Victorian Forts data sheet on Lentney Battery

Forts of Plymouth, Devon
Military history of Devon
Coastal artillery
Artillery batteries